Samia Henni is a writer, historian, educator, and curator. She teaches history of architecture and urban development at Cornell University. Her work focuses on the intersection of the built and destroyed environments with colonial practices and military operations from the early 19th century up to the present days.

Henni is the author of the multi-award-winning Architecture of Counterrevolution: The French Army in Northern Algeria (EN, gta Verlag, 2017; FR, Edition B42, 2019), in which she examined French colonial territorial transformations and spatial counterinsurgency measures in Algeria under colonial rule, especially during the Algerian Revolution (1954-1962). She is the editor of War Zones: gta papers 2 (gta Verlag 2018) and Deserts Are Not Empty (Columbia Books on Architecture and the City, 2022).

She has curated various exhibitions, including Discreet Violence: Architecture and the French War in [[Algeria]] at the gta Institute, ETH Zurich; The New Institute in Rotterdam; Archive Kabinett in Berlin; the Graduate School of Architecture, University of Johannesburg, La Colonie in Paris, VI PER Gallery in Prague,  AAP Exhibitions at Cornell University, the Twelve Gates Arts in Philadelphia, and the University of Virginia in Charlottesville. 

She studied at the École polytechnique d'architecture et d'urbanisme in Algiers; Accademia di Architettura di Mendrisio, Università della Svizzera Italiana; The Berlage Institute in Rotterdam; and at Goldsmiths, University of London and has received her Ph.D. from ETH Zurich. Before joining Cornell, she has taught in various universities such as Princeton University, ETH Zurich, the University of Zurich, and the University of Applied Sciences in Geneva.

She was the inaugural Albert Hirschman Chair (2021-22) for Identity Passions Between Europe and the Mediterranean at the Institute for Advanced Study (IMéRA) in Marseille; a Visiting Professor (Fall 2021) at the Institute of Art History at the University of Zurich; and a Geddes Visiting Fellow (Spring 2021) at the School of Architecture and Landscape Architecture (ESALA), Edinburgh College of Art, the University of Edinburgh.

Books 
 Deserts Are Not Empty. New York: Columbia Books on Architecture and the City, 2022.
 Architecture de la contre-révolution: L'armée française dans le nord de l'Algérie. Paris: Editions B42, 2019. (In French)
 War Zones: gta papers 2. Zurich: gta Verlag, 2018. 
 Architecture of Counterrevolution: The French Army in Northern Algeria. Zurich: gta Verlag, 2017.

Book chapters
 “‘Experience’ Rather Than ‘Project:’ Deluz Pedagogy in Post-revolutionary Algiers,” in Radical Pedagogies edited by Beatriz Colomina, Ignacio G. Galan, Evangelos Kotsiori and Anna-Maria Meister. Massachusetts: MIT Press, 2022. 
 “Forbidding Homelessness: The State and the First Lockdown in Marseille,” in Who’s Next? We Need to Talk About Homelessness, edited Daniel Talesnik and Andres Lepik. Berlin: ArchiTangle, 2021, 76–81.
 “Desertcide: ‘Oil Lakes’ as Archival Violence,” in Space/War edited by Asaiel Al Saeed, Aseel Al Yaqoub, Saphiya Abu Al-Maati, and Yousef Awaad. 2021. 
 “Boumedienne, Niemeyer: When Militarism Meets Modernism,” Foreword to The Revolution Will Be Stopped Halfway: Oscar Niemeyer in Algeria. New York: Columbia Books on Architecture and the City, 2019.
 “Female Agency and Psychological Warfare: French Colonial Civil and Military Interventions in Algeria, 1954–1962,” Productive Universals–Specific Situations. Clinical Engagements in Art, Architecture, Design and Urbanism. Berlin: Sternberg Press, 2019.

Essays
 “The Battle for Internationalization and Independence,” in The Funambulist no. 42: Algerian Independence and Global Revolution 1962–2022 (July-August 2022): 46–53.
 “Fanon on Colonial Space,” in ARCH+ no. 246 Zeitgenössische feministische Raumpraxis (February 2022): 164–165.
 “Oil, Gas, Dust: From the Sahara to Europe,” in Coloniality of Infrastructure, e-flux Architecture, 2021.
 “Exhibition as a Form of Writing: On Discreet Violence: Architecture and the French War in Algeria,” in PARSE journal: On the Question of Exhibition, edited by Nick Aikens, Kjell Caminha, Jyoti Mistry, and Mick Wilson, 2021.
 “The Coloniality of an Executive Order,” Canadian Centre for Architecture, Journeys and Translations series (June 21, 2020).
 “Photographing Confinement,” Jadaliyya, Photography and Audiovisual Narratives (July 7, 2020).
 “Colonial Ramifications,” e-flux Architecture, History/Theory (October 31, 2018).

Awards and fellowships
 2021–2022	Albert Hirschman Chair for Identity Passions Between Europe and the Mediterranean, the Institute for Advanced Study, the University of Aix-Marseille.
 2021 Invited Geddes Visiting Fellow, School of Architecture and Landscape Architecture (ESALA), Edinburgh College of Art, the University of Edinburgh. 
 2020 Spiro Kostof Book Award from the Society of Architectural Historians 
 2018 Silver Book Award by the Festival International du Livre d'Art et du Film (FILAF)
 2018 Best Book Award in Theory of Art by the FILA
 2017 Best PhD Dissertation, Silver Medal of the ETH Zurich

External links
 https://www.archpaper.com/2022/11/architecture-community-support-dr-samia-henni-cornell-aap-office-burglarized/

See also 
Lesley Lokko
Rosalys Coope
 Martha Levisman
 Simon Pepper (professor)

References 

ETH Zurich alumni
Living people
Cornell University faculty
Architectural historians
Architectural theoreticians
Year of birth missing (living people)
Algerian curators
Algerian women curators